or  is a river in the municipality of Rana in Nordland county, Norway. The river flows out of the eastern part of the lake Virvatnet. This is a large, continuous, very rich and untouched wetland area with tarns, rivers, marshes, and very tight vegetation. Virvasselva has a good population of Arctic char.

The much smaller river then continues north and meets the main river Ranelva at Elvmøtheia in the Dunderland Valley.

Media gallery

See also
List of rivers in Norway

References

Rana, Norway
Rivers of Nordland
Rivers of Norway